Wang Erduo (born 9 January 1999) is a Chinese footballer who currently plays for Chinese Super League side Guangzhou R&F.

Club career
Wang Erduo started his professional football career in February 2017 when he was loaned to Hong Kong Premier League side R&F from Guangzhou R&F. On 2 December 2017, he made his senior debut in a 2–1 loss to Hong Kong Pegasus in the 2017–18 Sapling Cup, coming on as a substitute for Li Rui. He made his league debut on 4 March 2018 in a 2–2 home draw to Biu Chun Rangers, coming on for Yang Ziyi in the 82nd minute.

Career statistics
 

1League Cups include Hong Kong Senior Shield and Hong Kong Sapling Cup.

References

External links
 

1999 births
Living people
Association football forwards
Chinese footballers
People from Nanyang, Henan
Footballers from Henan
R&F (Hong Kong) players
Hong Kong Premier League players